Coleophora summivola is a moth of the family Coleophoridae. It is found in China.

References

summivola
Moths of Asia
Moths described in 1930